

Major associations

Academy Awards

BAFTA Awards

Golden Globe Awards

Grammy Awards

Emmy Awards

Screen Actors Guild Awards

Other awards and nominations

Critics Awards

Empire Awards

Festival Awards

Independent Spirit Awards

Golden Raspberry Awards

Hasty Pudding Theatricals

MTV Movie Awards

People's Choice Awards

Satellite Awards

Saturn Awards

Young Artist Awards

Miscellaneous film and television awards

References

Lists of awards received by American actor